Return of Superfly (Original Motion Picture Soundtrack) is the original soundtrack to Sig Shore's 1990 film The Return of Superfly. It was released on August 13, 1990 via Capitol Records, and consisted of soul music songs by Curtis Mayfield and hip hop tracks by various rappers, including Capital Punishment Organization, Def Jef, Eazy-E, Ice-T, King Tee, Mellow Man Ace, Tone Lōc and Uzi Bros. The soundtrack wasn't much of a success, only making it to 72 on the US Billboard Top R&B/Hip-Hop Albums chart.

Track listing

References

External links

1990 soundtrack albums
Crime film soundtracks
Hip hop soundtracks
Albums produced by DJ Pooh
Albums produced by Dr. Dre
Capitol Records soundtracks